The 2016 Women's Youth World Handball Championship was the sixth edition of the tournament and took place in Slovakia from 19 to 31 July 2016.

Russia won their second title after defeating Denmark 30–22 in the final.

Teams
Africa

Asia

Europe

 (Host)

Pan-America

Venues
Matches will be played in Bratislava.

Ondrej Nepela Arena (10,055)
Aegon Arena (4,000)

Referees
16 referee pairs were selected.

Preliminary round

Group A

Group B

Group C

Group D

President's Cup

21st place bracket

21–24th place semifinals

23rd place game

21st place game

17th place bracket

17–20th place semifinals

19th place game

17th place game

9–16th placement games
The eight losers of the round of 16 were seeded according to their results in the preliminary round against teams ranked 1–4.

Ranking

15th place game

13th place game

Eleventh place game

Ninth place game

Knockout stage

Bracket

5th place bracket

Round of 16

Quarterfinals

5–8th place semifinals

Semifinals

Seventh place game

Fifth place game

Third place game

Final

Final ranking

Awards
 MVP :  Karina Sabirova
 Top Goalscorer :  Bernadett Hornyák (78 goals)
 Best defender :  Guro Nestaker

All-Star Team
 Goalkeeper :  Lærke Sørensen
 Right wing :  Mariia Dudina
 Right back :  Antonina Skorobogatchenko
 Centre back :  Gim A-yeong
 Left back :  Song Jin-mi
 Left wing :  Emma Friis
 Pivot :  Ida-Marie Dahl

References

External links
Official website
IHF website

2016 Women's Youth World Handball Championship
Women's Youth World Handball Championship
2016
Sports competitions in Bratislava
Women's Youth World Handball Championship
Women's handball in Slovakia
Youth World Handball Championship